Alf Busk (born 16 April 1958) is a former international speedway rider from Denmark.

Speedway career 
Busk won the gold medal at the Individual Speedway Junior European Championship in the 1977 Individual Speedway Junior European Championship.

He rode in the top tier of British Speedway from 1977 to 1985, riding for Coventry Bees, Sheffield Tigers and Swindon Robins.

World final appearances

World Longtrack Championship
 1979 –  Marianske Lazne 15th 3pts

European final appearances

European Under-21
 1977 -  Vojens, Vojens Speedway Center  - 1st - 9pts

References 

1958 births
Danish speedway riders
Coventry Bees riders
Sheffield Tigers riders
Swindon Robins riders
Living people
People from Silkeborg
Sportspeople from the Central Denmark Region